Visar Musliu (born 13 November 1994) is a Macedonian professional footballer who plays as a centre-back for German club FC Ingolstadt and the North Macedonia national team.

Club career
Musliu started his football career in FK Renova where he spent most of his first five years. In between, he also spent six months on loan at FK Gostivar. The summer in 2014, he transferred to Swiss side St. Gallen on a one-year contract, but he didn't get to play there as they sent him back on loan to Renova.

On 3 June 2017, he made a transfer to Macedonian champion FK Vardar where they hired him as a reinforcement for the upcoming Champions League qualifications. In the end, Musliu helped Vardar qualify for the 2017-18 Europa League Group stage, becoming the first Macedonian football club to ever qualify for a European UEFA tournament.

On 5 August 2019, he moved from Shkëndija to Hungarian outfit Fehérvár.

On 19 January 2022, Musliu joined 2. Bundesliga club FC Ingolstadt.

International career
Musliu was part of the Macedonia national under-21 football team from 2013 to 2017, winning 12 caps. He was part of the first Macedonia U21 generation that qualified for a final tournament where he also got to play in the last game in the groups, coming in as a substitute in the 28th minute for Marjan Radeski in the match against Portugal.

On 2 September 2017, he also made his debut for the senior national team in a World Cup qualifier against Israel, where Visar played the full game and helped his side keep a clean sheet in the 1–0 victory. As of 1 April 2020, Musliu has earned a total of 20 caps, scoring one goal.

Career statistics

International
Scores and results list North Macedonia's goal tally first, score column indicates score after each Musliu goal.

References

External links
 
 Profile at Macedonian Football 
 
 

1994 births
Living people
People from Gostivar
Albanian footballers from North Macedonia
Macedonian footballers
Association football defenders
North Macedonia youth international footballers
North Macedonia under-21 international footballers
North Macedonia international footballers
UEFA Euro 2020 players
FK Renova players
KF Gostivari players
FK Vardar players
KF Shkëndija players
Fehérvár FC players
FC Ingolstadt 04 players
Macedonian First Football League players
Nemzeti Bajnokság I players
2. Bundesliga players
Macedonian expatriate footballers
Expatriate footballers in Switzerland
Macedonian expatriate sportspeople in Switzerland
Expatriate footballers in Kosovo
Macedonian expatriate sportspeople in Kosovo
Expatriate footballers in Hungary
Macedonian expatriate sportspeople in Hungary
Expatriate footballers in Germany
Macedonian expatriate sportspeople in Germany